Atelozella is a genus of horse flies in the family Tabanidae.

Species
Atelozella fuelleborni (Enderlein, 1923)
Atelozella subulata Oldroyd, 1957)

References

Tabanidae
Brachycera genera
Diptera of Africa
Taxa named by Joseph Charles Bequaert